Kungsholm Church or Ulrika Eleonora Church is a church building at Bergsgatan on the island of Kungsholmen in Stockholm, Sweden. Belonging to the Västermalm Parish of the Church of Sweden, the church was inaugurated on 2 December 1688 (Old Style).

References

External links

17th-century Church of Sweden church buildings
Churches in Stockholm
Churches completed in 1688
1688 establishments in Sweden
Churches in the Diocese of Stockholm (Church of Sweden)